Lobobrachus is a genus of beetles in the family Carabidae, containing the following species:

 Lobobrachus alternans Tschitscherine, 1901
 Lobobrachus lacerdae Sharp, 1885

References

Pterostichinae